Craig Henwood (born 10 December 1978 in Melbourne, Victoria) is an Australian sport shooter. He won a gold medal for the men's trap shooting at the 2005 Oceanian Shooting Championships in Brisbane, accumulating a score of 143 clay pigeons. Henwood is a member of the Melbourne Gun Club, and is coached and trained by his father Jack Henwood.

Henwood represented Australia at the 2008 Summer Olympics in Beijing, where he competed in the men's trap shooting, along with his teammate and five-time Olympian Michael Diamond. He scored a total of 109 clay pigeons in the preliminary rounds of the event, by one point ahead of Egypt's Adham Medhat, finishing only in thirty-first place.

In November 2020, Henwood was elected to the board of Shooting Australia replacing the retiring Alan Smith

References

External links
Profile – Australian Olympic Team
NBC Olympics Profile

Australian male sport shooters
Trap and double trap shooters
Living people
Olympic shooters of Australia
Shooters at the 2008 Summer Olympics
Sportspeople from Melbourne
1978 births
21st-century Australian people
Sportsmen from Victoria (Australia)